Bob Hewitt and Frew McMillan were the defending champions but only McMillan competed that year with Colin Dibley.

Dibley and McMillan lost in the second round to John Feaver and John James.

Tim Gullikson and Tom Gullikson won the doubles title at the 1979 Queen's Club Championships tennis tournament defeating Marty Riessen and Sherwood Stewart in the final 6–4, 6–4.

Seeds

Draw

Final

Top half

Bottom half

References

External links
Official website Queen's Club Championships 
ATP tournament profile

Doubles